The Genius (Spanish:El supersabio) is a 1948 Mexican comedy film directed by Miguel M. Delgado and starring Cantinflas, Perla Aguiar and Carlos Martínez Baena. The film's sets were designed by the art director Gunther Gerszo.

Plot
Cantinflas is an assistant to a leading scientist. He is pursued by a gang who wish to discover the secret formula for a cheaper fuel that his boss has allegedly discovered.

Cast
 Cantinflas as himself 
 Perla Aguiar as Marisa Miranda 
 Carlos Martínez Baena as Professor Archimedes Monteagudo 
 Alejandro Cobo as Octavio  
 Aurora Walker as Angélica Montes  
 Alfredo Varela as Pepe Montes  
 José Pidal as Doctor Inocencio Violante 
 Eduardo Casado as Presidente de directorio petroleo  
 Francisco Jambrina as Fiscal  
 Pepe Martínez as Lic. Remigio Paredes  
 Felipe Montoya as Señor Humberto Moya  
 Rafael Icardo asAgustín Montes  
 Carmen Novelty as Hija de Angélica Montes 
 Armando Arriola as Ayudante de el Rosca  
 Jorge Treviño as El Rosca 
 José Ortiz de Zárate as Juez 
 Julio Ahuet as Detective 
 Julio Daneri as Miembro directivo petroleo   
 Julián de Meriche as Italiano en directivo petroleo  
 Lupe del Castillo as Portera 
 Pedro Elviro as Empleado corte   
 Edmundo Espino as Doctor   
 Enrique García Álvarez as Señor director  
 Leonor Gómez as Mujer en turba  
 Miguel Manzano as Reportero  
 Paco Martínez as Professor  
 Héctor Mateos as Miembro directivo petroleo  
 Kika Meyer as Espectadora corte  
 José Muñoz as Plomero  
 Manuel Noriega Ruiz as Professor 
 Roberto Y. Palacios as Plomero 
 José Pardavé as Fotógrafo  
 Remigio Paredes as Invitado  
 Luis Manuel Pelayo as Reportero  
 Ignacio Peón as Miembro jurado  
 Francisco Reiguera as Professor Peralta 
 Humberto Rodríguez as Velador

References

Bibliography 
 Peter Standish & Steven M. Bell. Culture and Customs of Mexico. Greenwood Publishing Group, 2004.

External links 
 

1948 films
1948 comedy films
Mexican comedy films
1940s Spanish-language films
Films directed by Miguel M. Delgado
Mexican black-and-white films
1940s Mexican films